Darton railway station is a railway station in Darton, in the Metropolitan Borough of Barnsley, South Yorkshire, England. Train services are provided by Northern.

The station was opened by the Manchester and Leeds Railway on 1 January 1850.

The railway station is in South Yorkshire but West Yorkshire Metro tickets are also valid to and from this station.  The reason for this is that the West-South Yorkshire boundary historically ran between the village and its main source of employment, Woolley Colliery.

The car park at the station was recently reported by the local police force as having the highest incidence of vehicle break-ins in the Barnsley area, but the installation of CCTV is hoped to address this problem.

Facilities
The station is unstaffed and no longer has any permanent buildings aside from standard waiting shelters on each side (the old buildings were demolished after the station lost its staffing in 1970). Timetable posters and digital display screens provide train running information and there is step-free access to both platforms.

Services

There is an hourly service to  via  and  northbound and to  via Barnsley southbound. The service is two-hourly in each direction on Sundays.

References

External links

Railway stations in Barnsley
DfT Category F1 stations
Former Lancashire and Yorkshire Railway stations
Railway stations in Great Britain opened in 1850
Northern franchise railway stations